A by-election for the seat of Cheltenham in the South Australian House of Assembly was held on 9 February 2019. The by-election was triggered by the parliamentary resignation of Labor Party MP and former Premier Jay Weatherill on 17 December 2018. Labor candidate Joe Szakacs retained the seat with an increased margin.

An Enfield by-election was held on the same day, as Weatherill's former deputy leader and Deputy Premier, John Rau, had also resigned from parliament.

Dates

Candidates

The Liberal Party declined to field a candidate for both the Cheltenham and Enfield by-elections.

Result

See also
2019 Enfield state by-election
List of South Australian House of Assembly by-elections

References

External links
2019 Cheltenham by-election guide: Antony Green ABC
2019 Cheltenham by-election guide: Tally Room

South Australian state by-elections
2019 elections in Australia
February 2019 events in Australia